Vincent Massey Collegiate (more commonly referred to as VMC or Massey) is a suburban, English and French Immersion high school. Named after Vincent Massey, the eighteenth Governor General of Canada, the school is located in the neighbourhood of Fort Garry in Winnipeg, Manitoba. It has approximately 1300 students enrolled in over 100 courses. The school offers core subjects in English and French, but offers the opportunity to take beginner-level Spanish, and Japanese. The school has an English as an Additional Language Programme, which helps integrate students whose first language is not English.

They offer extracurricular activities including music, drama and international exchange programmes. Vincent Massey also offers online courses. The school was also one of the first National UNESCO ASPnet schools in Canada. Recently they have integrated Grade 9 French Immersion students into the school.

External links
 School web site

High schools in Winnipeg
Educational institutions established in 1960
1960 establishments in Manitoba

Fort Garry, Winnipeg